Ilam Airport  is a domestic airport located about  from the center of Ilam City, Iran.

Airlines and destinations

References

Airports in Iran
Transportation in Ilam Province
Buildings and structures in Ilam Province